The Latin Bishopric of Salona was a Roman Catholic diocese centred on Amfissa (medieval Salona), in Central Greece, during the period of Frankish rule there after the Fourth Crusade. The see was suppressed with the conquest of the region by the Ottoman Turks in 1410, but is retained by the Catholic Church as a titular see. It has been vacant since 1964.

The see is attested for the first time in the Provinciale Romanum, a list of the sees subordinate to the See of Rome, dating to 1228. It lists Salona as one of the eight suffragan sees of the Latin Archbishopric of Athens. The absence of Salona as a see in previous Notitiae Episcopatuum of the Orthodox Patriarchate of Constantinople has led to the Bishopric of Salona being usually considered a new foundation. Raymond-Joseph Loenertz however suggested that it was actually a replacement of the Greek Orthodox bishopric in nearby Loidoriki, and is followed by Kenneth Setton.

Residential bishops

Titular bishops 
The known titular bishops of Salona were:

References

Sources
 

Catholic titular sees in Europe
Salona
Former Roman Catholic dioceses in Greece
Lordship of Salona
Salona
13th-century establishments in Europe
Frankokratia